is a railway station on the Ban'etsu West Line in the town of Inawashiro, Fukushima Prefecture, Japan, operated by East Japan Railway Company (JR East).

Lines

Station layout
Sekito Station has two opposed side platforms connected to the station building by an level crossing. However, the Platform 2 is used only for passing trains. The station is unattended.

Platforms

History
Sekito Station opened on July 15, 1899.  The station was absorbed into the JR East network upon the privatization of the Japanese National Railways (JNR) on April 1, 1987.

Surrounding area

See also
 List of railway stations in Japan

External links
 JR East Station information 

Railway stations in Fukushima Prefecture
Ban'etsu West Line
Railway stations in Japan opened in 1899
Inawashiro, Fukushima